Hannah Schaefer (born June 2, 1996) is an American Christian musician, who plays writes, plays and sings a Christian pop style of music. She released All the Way, an extended play, in 2015, and her first album Who I Am in 2020.

Biography
Hannah Anise Schaefer was born on June 2, 1996, in Columbia City, Indiana. Before embarking on her Christian music career, she was accepted into the Jacob's School of Music at Indiana University, but decided not to attend. She is a practicing Roman Catholic at St. Paul of the Cross Parish.

She started her music recording career with the extended play All the Way,  released on October 30, 2015. She won the John Lennon Songwriting Contest in the Gospel/Inspirational category that same year.

Discography
EPs
All the Way (October 30, 2015)

Albums
Who I Am (March 20, 2020)
Crown (October 1, 2021)

References

External links
 Official website
 All Access interview

1996 births
Living people
American women songwriters
American performers of Christian music
Singers from Indiana
Songwriters from Indiana
People from Columbia City, Indiana
Catholics from Indiana
21st-century American singers
21st-century American women singers